Leonhard Pföderl (born 1 September 1993) is a German professional ice hockey forward. He is currently playing for Eisbären Berlin in the Deutsche Eishockey Liga (DEL) and he competed in the 2018 Winter Olympics, capturing a silver medal.

Playing career
During the 2015–16 season, his fourth with the Thomas Sabo Ice Tigers, Pföderl agreed to a three-year contract extension on 24 February 2016.

After completing the 2018–19 season, his seventh in the DEL with the Ice Tigers, Pföderl left as a free agent in securing a multi-year contract with fellow German club, Eisbären Berlin on April 3, 2019.

Career statistics

Regular season and playoffs

International

Awards and honours

References

External links

1993 births
Living people
People from Bad Tölz
Sportspeople from Upper Bavaria
Eisbären Berlin players
Ice hockey players at the 2018 Winter Olympics
German ice hockey right wingers
Medalists at the 2018 Winter Olympics
Olympic ice hockey players of Germany
Olympic medalists in ice hockey
Olympic silver medalists for Germany
Thomas Sabo Ice Tigers players
Ice hockey players at the 2022 Winter Olympics